The Ijen volcano complex is a group of composite volcanoes located on the border between Banyuwangi Regency and Bondowoso Regency of East Java, Indonesia. It is known for its blue fire, acidic crater lake, and labour-intensive sulfur mining.

The Gunung Merapi stratovolcano is the highest point of that complex. The name "Gunung Merapi" means 'mountain of fire' in the Indonesian language; Mount Merapi in central Java and Marapi in Sumatra have the same etymology.

West of Gunung Merapi is the Ijen volcano, which has a  turquoise-coloured acidic crater lake. The lake is the site of a labour-intensive sulfur mining operation, in which sulfur-laden baskets are carried by hand from the crater floor. The work is paid well considering the cost of living in the area, but is very onerous.  Workers earn around US$13 per day and, once out of the crater, still need to carry their loads of sulfur chunks about three kilometers to the nearby Paltuding Valley to get paid.

Many other post-caldera cones and craters are located within the caldera or along its rim. The largest concentration of post-caldera cones run east–west across the southern side of the caldera.

The lake is recognised as the largest highly acidic crater lake in the world. It is also a source for the river Banyupahit, resulting in highly acidic and metal-enriched river water which has a significant detrimental effect on the downstream river ecosystem. During a scientific expedition in 2001, the pH of the lake was measured at <0.3.  On July 14–15, 2008, explorer George Kourounis took a small rubber boat out onto the acid lake to measure its acidity. The pH of the water at the lake's edges was measured to be 0.5 and in the middle of the lake 0.13 due to a high concentration of sulfuric acid.

Blue fire crater

Since National Geographic mentioned the electric-blue flame of Ijen, tourist numbers have increased. The phenomenon has long been known, but midnight hiking tours are a more recent offering. A two-hour hike is required to reach the rim of the crater, followed by a 45-minute hike down to the bank of the crater. 

Ijen is the largest blue flame area in the world. Local people refer to it as Api Biru (Blue Fire). The other location at which blue fire can be seen is in Dallol mountain, Ethiopia.

Sulfur mining at Ijen 
An active vent at the edge of the lake is a source of elemental sulfur and supports a mining operation. Escaping volcanic gases are channeled through a network of ceramic pipes, resulting in condensation of molten sulfur.

The sulfur, which is deep red in colour when molten, pours slowly from the ends of these pipes and pools on the ground, turning bright yellow as it cools. The miners break the cooled material into large pieces and carry it away in baskets. Miners carry loads ranging from  up  to the crater rim, with a gradient of 45 to 60 degrees, and then  down the mountain for weighing. Most miners make this journey twice a day.

A nearby sulfur refinery pays the miners by the weight of sulfur transported; as of September 2010, the typical daily earnings were equivalent to approximately $13 US. The miners often receive insufficient protection while working around the volcano and complain of numerous respiratory afflictions. There are 200 miners, who extract 14 tons per day — about 20% of the continuous daily deposit.

Media

Ijen and its sulfur mining was featured in the 1991 IMAX film Ring of Fire, and as a topic on the 5th episode of the BBC television documentary Human Planet.

In the documentary film War Photographer, journalist James Nachtwey visits Ijen and struggles with noxious fumes while trying to photograph workers. Michael Glawogger's film Workingman's Death is about sulfur workers.

Gallery

See also 
 List of volcanoes in Indonesia
 Mazuku

References

External links

 Ijen Gallery
 Volcanological Survey of Indonesia
 Official website of Indonesian volcanoes at USGS
 The Adventures Behind Filming Ring of Fire
 Large photogallery from Kawah Ijen 
 Sulfur mining in Kawah Ijen (The Big Picture photo gallery at Boston.com)
 
 More sulfur mining pictures at Ijen
 Spectacular Neon Blue Lava Pours From Indonesia's Kawah Ijen Volcano At Night (PHOTOS)

Active volcanoes of Indonesia
Volcanic crater lakes
Mountains of East Java
Stratovolcanoes of Indonesia
Subduction volcanoes
Sulfur mines
Volcanoes of East Java
Holocene stratovolcanoes